Bagdashkino is a rural locality (a village) in Yuldybayevsky Selsoviet, Kugarchinsky District, Bashkortostan, Russia. The population was 165 as of 2010. There is 1 street.

Geography 
Bagdashkino is located 6 km south of Mrakovo (the district's administrative centre) by road.

References 

Rural localities in Kugarchinsky District